Aparallactus turneri, or the Malindi centipede-eater, is a species of venomous rear-fanged snake in the family Lamprophiidae. The species is endemic to Kenya.

Etymology
The specific name, turneri, is in honor of British taxidermist H.J. Allen Turner (1876–1953), who lived in Kenya.

Geographic range
A. turneri is found in coastal Kenya.

Habitat

Reproduction
A. turneri is oviparous.

References

External links
de Witte G-F, Laurent RF (1947). "Revision d'un groupe de Colubridae africains: genres Calamelaps, Miodon, Aparallactus, et formes affines ". Mémoires du Muséum Royal d'Histoire Naturelle de Belgique, série deuxième [Second Series ] 29: 1–134. (Aparallactus turneri, p. 121). (in French).
Loveridge A (1935). "Scientific results of an expedition to rain forest regions in Eastern Africa. I. New reptiles and amphibians from East Africa". Bull. Mus. Comp. Zool. Harvard 79: 1–19. (Aparallactus turneri, new species, pp. 9–10). (full text of original description, https://archive.org/stream/bulletinofmuseum79harv/bulletinofmuseum79harv_djvu.txt).
Spawls, Stephen; Howell, Kim; Hinkel, Harald; Menegon, Michele (2018). Field Guide to East African Reptiles, Second Edition. London: Bloomsbury Natural History. 624 pp. . (Aparallactus turneri, p. 456).

Endemic fauna of Kenya
Atractaspididae
Reptiles described in 1935